Boron oxide may refer to one of several oxides of boron:

Boron trioxide (B2O3, diboron trioxide), the most common form
Boron monoxide (B2O), theoretical, unstable
Boron suboxide (B6O)

Boron compounds